Barbara Catharina Kathmann (born 12 May 1978) is a Dutch politician, serving as a member of the House of Representatives since 2021. She is a member of the Labour Party (PvdA). Before being elected to the House, she served as a municipal councilor and alderwoman in her hometown Rotterdam. Kathmann has also worked in media and at two nonprofit organizations.

Early life and non-political career 
She was born in 1978 in Rotterdam as the daughter of an architect and a nurse and grew up in the neighborhood Spangen. She has an older brother and an older sister. Kathmann attended the Rotterdamsch Lyceum at  level from 1990 until 1997 and subsequently studied law at Utrecht University. In 1999, she took a job as account manager at the Bureau voor Managementondersteuning, a management consultancy firm, and started studying history of international relations at the same university. Kathmann would finish that study in 2007.

She joined the new pragmatic idealistic radio and television broadcaster LLiNK in 2004, the year before it became part of the Dutch public broadcasting system. There, she served as senior editor, host, and correspondent. Kathmann also started working as a voice-over. LLiNK ceased broadcasting in 2010, as the NPO would not carry its programming anymore. That year, she and her then boyfriend established the foundation Jarige Job (Birthday boy), which gifts boxes with supplies to celebrate a birthday to children living in poverty. She served as its director for two years. Simultaneously, she worked as an editor and producer at CCCP, a creator of television programs and marketing content.

In 2012, Kathmann became project manager at the Giovanni van Bronckhorst Foundation, which offers a sports education program to help children in their last two years of primary school, when it was founded. She was promoted to director and remained in that position until her appointment as alderwoman in Rotterdam.

Politics 
Kathmann was elected to the Rotterdam municipal council in the 2014 municipal elections. She was the Labour Party's second candidate and became deputy caucus leader. In the council, Kathmann focussed on sustainability and mobility. She was her party's  in the 2018 municipal election in Rotterdam and campaigned on addressing inequality by creating jobs. She was re-elected and became her party's caucus leader.

In July 2018, when a new coalition had been formed, she left the council to become alderwoman of economy, neighborhoods, and villages. Kathmann also appeared 41st on the PvdA's party list during the 2019 provincial election in South Holland. As alderwoman, she was responsible for preparing the Hook of Holland ferry for a potential no-deal Brexit. Furthermore, Kathmann started a pilot that turned about 90 retail properties into residential ones in order to combat vacancy. For the same reason, she founded a taskforce to reduce the number of shopping areas and to decrease the sizes of others. During the COVID-19 pandemic, Kathmann and the alderman of finance announced that entrepreneurs and independent contractors could postpone paying local taxes. She was also involved in Rotterdam's plan to revive the economy, which included a retraining program and €233 million in funding for seven construction projects to add green spaces.

House of Representatives 
She ran for member of parliament in the 2021 general election, being placed seventh on the Labour Party's list. In February 2021, Kathmann resigned from her position as alderwoman to campaign. She was sworn in as House member on 31 March after she had been elected with 4,780 preference votes. Kathmann became the Labour Party's spokesperson for security, justice, and the interior. Her portfolio later changed to social affairs, employment, economic affairs, and climate, and she is a member of the Committees for Digital Affairs, the Interior, Justice and Security, Kingdom Relations, and Public Expenditure as well as the parliamentary inquiry into natural gas extraction Groningen. Kathmann is also the secretary of the Labour Party caucus.

She wrote an opinion piece with Kati Piri in 2022, in which they stated that corporations had become addicted to migrant workers. According to them, this should be addressed through higher wages and through tackling violations of labor laws. Kathmann also co-filed an amendment to shorten the term for personal debt restructuring from three to one and a half years. It received the support from a majority of the House. In 2023, she continued a 2017 effort by her party to introduce the right to disconnect. She argued that anxiety about short-term contracts was pressuring employees into engaging in work-related activities outside of work hours. To accommodate for occupations that deal with emergencies, the bill would not provide an absolute right to not be disturbed, but it would force employers to make agreements with their workers.

Kathmann was one of her party's  in Rotterdam in the 2022 municipal elections.

Personal life 
She lives in Rotterdam and is married to Huib Lloyd, who she met at a hockey club during her childhood. They have three sons.

References 

1978 births
Living people
21st-century Dutch politicians
21st-century Dutch women politicians
Aldermen of Rotterdam
Dutch nonprofit directors
Founders of charities
Labour Party (Netherlands) politicians
Members of the House of Representatives (Netherlands)
Municipal councillors of Rotterdam
Utrecht University alumni